Algeciras is a municipality of Spain belonging to the province of Cádiz, Andalusia. Located in the southern end of the Iberian Peninsula, near the Strait of Gibraltar, it is the largest city on the Bay of Gibraltar. The Port of Algeciras is one of the largest ports in Europe and the world in three categories: container, cargo and transshipment. The urban area straddles the small Río de la Miel, which is the southernmost river of continental Europe. As of 1 January 2020, the municipality had a registered population of 123,078, second in its province after Jerez de la Frontera and greater than Cádiz city population. It forms part of the comarca of Campo de Gibraltar.

The surrounding metro area also includes the municipalities of Los Barrios, La Línea de la Concepción, Castellar de la Frontera, Jimena de la Frontera, San Roque and Tarifa, with a population of 263,739.

Name

History
The area of the city has been populated since prehistory, and the earliest remains belong to Neanderthal populations from the Paleolithic era.

Due to its strategic position it was an important port under the Phoenicians, and was the site of the relevant Roman port of Portus Albus ("White Port"), with two nearby cities called Caetaria (possibly founded by the Iberians) and Iulia Traducta, founded by the Romans.

Recently it has been proposed that the site of Iulia Transducta was the Villa Vieja of Algeciras.

After being destroyed by the Goths and their Vandal allies, Tarik landed in Algeciras and Tarifa in April 711.

In the year 859 AD Viking troops on board 62 drekars and commanded by the leaders Hastein and Björn Ironside besieged the city for three days and subsequently laid waste to much of it. After looting the houses of the rich, they burnt the Aljama mosque and the Banderas mosque. Reorganized near the medina, the inhabitants managed to recover the city and make the invaders run away, capturing two boats.

It enjoyed a brief period of independence as a taifa state from 1035 to 1058. It was named al-Jazirah al-Khadra''' ("Green Island") after the offshore Isla Verde; the modern name is derived from this original Arabic name (compare also Algiers and Al Jazeera). In 1055 Emir Al-Mutadid of Seville drove the Berbers from Algeciras, claiming it for Arabs.

Vowing to counter the Castilian expansion initiated by 1265, Nasrid Granada required assistance from Fez in late 1274 and ceded the place of Algeciras (together with Tarifa) to the Marinids.

In 1278, Algeciras was besieged by the forces of the Kingdom of Castile under the command of Alfonso X of Castile and his son, Sancho. This siege was the first of a series of attempts to take the city and ended in failure for the Castilian forces. An armada sent by Castile was also annihilated whilst trying to blockade the city's harbor.

The Marinid grip over the town further increased in the ensuing decades, and the place turned into a Marinid stronghold from which razzias were launched into the still incipient Christian settlements in the Lower Guadalquivir and the Guadalete area.

In July 1309 Ferdinand IV of Castile laid siege to Algeciras as well as Gibraltar. The latter fell into Christian hands, but Muslim Algeciras held on for the following three decades, until Alfonso XI of Castile resumed its siege. Juan Núñez de Lara, Juan Manuel, Pedro Fernández de Castro, Juan Alfonso de la Cerda, lord of Gibraleón all participated in the siege, as did knights from France, England and Germany, and even King Philip III of Navarre, king consort of Navarra, who came accompanied by 100 horsemen and 300 infantry. In March 1344, after several years of siege, Algeciras surrendered.

On winning the city, Alfonso XI made it the seat of a new diocese, established by Pope Clement VI's bull Gaudemus et exultamus of 30 April 1344, and entrusted to the governance of the bishop of Cadiz. The bishops of Cadiz continued to hold the title of Aliezira, as it called, until 1851, when in accordance with a concordat between Spain and the Holy See its territory was incorporated into the diocese of Cadiz. No longer a residential bishopric, Aliezira is today listed by the Catholic Church as a titular see.

Left relatively unguarded during the Castilian Civil War, the town was easily seized in 1369 by the Nasrids from Granada with assistance from a Marinid fleet. It was destroyed on the orders of Muhammed V of Granada. While tradition asserts that it was torn down immediately after the 1369 occupation, the Nasrid scorched-earth policy has been also dated to 1375, once Granadan repopulation efforts should have failed. The garrison was thus relocated to Gibraltar, with a worse port but more easily defensible, in Nasrid control after the Marinid retreat from the Iberian Peninsula. While the jurisdiction was ceded to Gibraltar in 1462 after the Castilian conquest of the latter place, there are hints about the continued existence of informal settlements by farmers and sepherds in the area, at least after 1466.

Algeciras was refounded after 1704 by refugees from Gibraltar following the territory's capture by Anglo-Dutch forces in the War of the Spanish Succession. As early as 1705, the place was described as "...a heap of stones,...only a few hovels scattered here and there, amidst an infinity of ruins". The sense of temporariness among the displaced population and the hopes for a return to Gibraltar were shattered by the 1713 Treaty of Utrecht. Besides Gibraltarians, throughout the 18th century repopulation was also participated by settlers from the rest of the Iberian Peninsula and from elsewhere, standing out Italians in the latter regard. Population rapidly increased (from 1,845 in 1725 to 6,241 in 1787). The Algeciras' social structure featured a comparatively small number of nobles and comparatively larger weight of clergy. Just like the rest of the Campo de Gibraltar, husbandry (cattle in particular) played an important role in the economy during the 18th century thanks to the rich pastures. Given the abundance of international conflicts in the Strait area during the 18th century, corsair activities against ships belligerent with Spain or neutral ships provisioning the enemy also became an important part of the economy.

It was fortified to guard against British raids with installations such as the Fuerte de Isla Verde built to guard key points. The city was rebuilt on its present rectangular plan by Charles III in 1760. In July 1801, the French and Spanish navies fought the British Royal Navy offshore in the Battle of Algeciras, which ended in a British victory.

The city became the scene for settling a major international crisis as it hosted the Algeciras Conference in 1906. The international forum to discuss the future of Morocco which was held in the Casa Consistorial (town hall). It confirmed the independence of Morocco against threats from Germany, and gave France control of banking and police interests. In July 1942 Italian frogmen set up in a secret base in the Italian tanker Olterra, which was interned in Algeciras, in order to attack shipping in Gibraltar. During the Franco era, Algeciras underwent substantial industrial development, creating many new jobs for the local workers made unemployed when the border between Gibraltar and Spain was sealed by Franco between 1969 and 1982.

In 1982 there was a failed plan codenamed Operation Algeciras conceived by the Argentinian military to sabotage the British military facilities in Gibraltar during the Falklands War. The Spanish authorities intervened just before the attack, and deported the two Argentine Montoneros and military liaison officer involved.

 Geography 
 Location 

Algeciras is located in the southern end of the Iberian Peninsula, in the comarca of Campo de Gibraltar. Its strategic location near the Strait of Gibraltar—the choke point connecting the Atlantic Ocean and the Mediterranean Sea also entailing the nearest distance between Europe and the African continent—has historically powered the importance of the port. The city proper lies on the western bank of the Bay of Gibraltar, fronting the Rock of Gibraltar, which dominates the eastern bank.

The lower course of the river Palmones forms part of the boundary of Algeciras with the municipality of Los Barrios.

The urban agglomeration formed by Algeciras and the surrounding settlements is the sixth largest in Andalusia and the third largest off the region's coast.

Climate
Algeciras has a Mediterranean subtropical climate (Köppen: Csa) with very mild, rainy winters and warm, dry summers with occasional heat waves, and temperature fluctuations are small because of the strong Oceanic influence. There are not snow registers in the city since the 19th century.

Population

Economy

Algeciras is principally a transport hub and industrial city. Its main activities are connected with the Port of Algeciras, which serves as the main embarkation point between Spain and Tangier and other ports in Morocco as well as the Canary Islands and the Spanish enclaves of Ceuta and Melilla. It is ranked as the 16th busiest port in the world. The city also has a substantial fishing industry and exports a range of agricultural products from the surrounding area, including cereals, tobacco and farm animals.

In recent years it has become a significant tourist destination, with popular day trips to Tarifa to see bird migrations; to Gibraltar to see the territory's sights and culture; and to the Bay of Gibraltar on whale watching excursions.

Algeciras is the southern terminus of two principal north–south Euroroutes, the E05 and E15. Both routes, moreover, run to Scotland (the E05 terminates at Greenock and the E15 at Inverness) via France and England.

Tourism

Places of interest include:

 Parque Natural del Estrecho
 Parque Natural Los Alcornocales

Transport

Public transport
The bus urban transport in managed by C.T.M. (Cooperativa de transporte de Marruecos).
 Bus lines:
 Line 1: Bajadilla-Pajarete
 Line 2: Colinas-San Bernabé-Reconquista
 Line 3: Rinconcillo
 Line 4: La Granja
 Line 5: Bahía de Algeciras
 Line 6: Juliana
 Line 7: Saladillo
 Line 8: San García-Saladillo
 Line 9: San García Directo
 Line 10: El Cobre
 Line 11: La Piñera
 Line 12: San García playa
 Line 16: Cementerio-Centro Penitenciario
 Line 18: Cortijo Vides-Piñera
 Line 19: Puerto-S.J.Artesano-Rinconcillo
 Line 21: San García – Residencia – Puerto – Parque

Rail
The Algeciras Gibraltar Railway Company built the Algeciras-Bobadilla railway line, which connects Algeciras railway station to Bobadilla, Antequera and continues to the rest of Spain, the train line terminates near the port of Algeciras.

Road
The main routes serving Algeciras include:
 European route E15
 European route E05
 Autopista AP-7
 Autovía A-48
 N-340
 GR 7

Intercity buses
The main bus station is located next to the train station. Several bus companies operate intercity bus services from and to Algeciras.

Airport
The nearest airports are:
 Gibraltar Airport – to 
 Jerez Airport – to 
 Málaga Airport – to 

In addition, the Algeciras Heliport is being built for transport to Ceuta and other areas in the region.

Monuments

 Hornos Romanos del Rinconcillo (first century B.C.). (furnaces)
 Factoría de salazones de la calle San Nicolás (first century). (salt meat factory)
 La Villa Vieja, torres de la Huerta del Carmen (tenth century). (Towers)
 Parque Arqueológico de las Murallas Meriníes (thirteenth century). (Archeological Park)
 Capilla de Nuestra Señora de Europa (1690). (Chapel)
 Iglesia de Nuestra Señora de la Palma (1736). (Church)
 Hospital de La Caridad, (1748).
 Capilla de la Caridad (1752). (Chapel)
 Casa Consistorial (1756). (City Council)
 Capilla de San Servando (1774). (Chapel)
 Capilla del Santo Cristo de la Alameda (1776). (Chapel)
 Plaza Alta (1807).
 Mercado de Abastos de Algeciras of engineer Eduardo Torroja Miret (1935). (Supplies Market)
 Art School Building. (1971) architect: Fernando Garrido Gutiérrez.
 Faro de Isla Verde. Project of Jaime Font, constructed in 1864. (Light)
 Hotel Reina Cristina (1901).
 District de San Isidro, typical district designed in the twentieth century.

Celebrations
 Arrastre de latas (5, January).
 Feria Real de Algeciras (June).
 Fiestas patronales en honor de Ntra. Sra. la Virgen de la Palma (August).
 Fiesta de los Tosantos (1, November).
 Carnival of Algeciras.

Sports

Algeciras CF, the association football club, founded in 1912, plays usually in the third-tier Segunda División B, with past spells in the lower Tercera División and the higher Segunda División. They play home games at the Estadio Nuevo Mirador.

Algeciras BM, the professional handball club, played in the Liga ASOBAL between 2005 and 2008. The team was dissolved due to enormous debts after relegation to second level in 2008.

Education

Universidad de Cádiz – Campus Bahia de Algeciras
The following education centres are property of the University of Cádiz:
 Escuela Politécnica Superior de Algeciras
 Escuela Universitaria de Enfermería de Algeciras
 Escuela Universitaria de Estudios Jurídicos y Económicos del Campo de Gibraltar "Francisco Tomás y Valiente"
 Escuela Universitaria de Magisterio "Virgen de Europa"
 Centro Universitario de Derecho de Algeciras (CUDA)
 Campus Bahia de Algeciras 

Noted Natives of Algeciras
 Yahya Ibn Yahya
Paco de Lucía
 Ramón de Algeciras
 Al-Mansur Ibn Abi Aamir
 Ana Belén Palomo
 Cristóbal Delgado Gómez
 José María Sánchez-Verdú
 Álvaro Morte
 Canelita

Sister cities

 Ceuta, Spain
 Neda, Spain
 Dakhla, Western Sahara

 See also 
 List of port cities of the Mediterranean Sea

 References 
Citations

 Algeciras. Encyclopædia Britannica Online, 2006.
 Algeciras. The Columbia Encyclopedia, 2004
 Lonely Planet Andalucia'', Lonely Planet, 2005
Bibliography

External links

  Ayuntamiento de Algeciras
  Expoalgeciras: Images Gallery (History and present from Algeciras with old and current photographs)

 
Municipalities of the Province of Cádiz
Populated coastal places in Spain
711 establishments
8th-century establishments in Spain
Populated places established in the 8th century